Timothy N. Machin (August 1822 – December 20, 1905) was an American politician and attorney who served as the 10th Lieutenant Governor of California from 1863 to 1867. He previously served in the California State Assembly, representing Tuolumne and Mono counties for two terms in 1862 and 1863.

Early life and education 
Machin was born in New York. Machin was the son of Thomas Machin Jr., a brigadier general of the militia and veteran of the War of 1812, and grandson of Captain Thomas Machin, the architect of the West Point Chain. He studied law at the State and National Law School in Ballston Spa, New York, along with Niles Searls and Chancellor Hartson.

Career 
After graduating from law school, he moved west and settled in Mono County, California.

While practicing law in Monoville, California, he was elected Mono County's choice for the California State Assembly as a Member of the California's 12th State Assembly district, serving from 1862 to 1863.

In 1863, he was chosen Speaker of the Assembly. Staunchly pro-Union during the Civil War, he made many influential contacts in the Republican Party and its wartime successor, the Union Democratic party. In 1863, he received the nomination for Lieutenant Governor of California, running with Frederick Low on the Unionist ticket. He ran against E.W. McKinstrey, beating him by 21,120 votes. As Lieutenant Governor, he was selected to prosecute the impeachment proceedings instituted against a popular jurist, Judge Hardy. During his tenure he was appointed the Superintendent of San Quentin State Prison. He remained Lt. Governor through 1867.

After his retirement from the Lieutenant Governorship, he made his home in the Clinton Park section of Oakland at 1276 Sixth Avenue.

Personal life 
Machin married Nancy M. Knight on April 15, 1864. They had one daughter, Elinor. He died in Oakland, California, on December 20, 1905.

References

1822 births
1905 deaths
Lieutenant Governors of California
Speakers of the California State Assembly
Republican Party members of the California State Assembly
State and National Law School alumni